Faris may refer to:

 Fāris, horseman or cavalier in Arabic
 Faris (name), a surname

Places
 Al-Faris, Salah al-Din Governorate, Iraq
 Fariš, North Macedonia
 Faris, Yemen
 Faris, Greece
 Faris Island, Nunavut, Canada
 Fāris, Arabic name for Persia

See also
 Al-Faris 8-400, an armoured vehicle
 SMS Tengku Muhammad Faris Petra, a school
 Fares (disambiguation)
 Pharis (disambiguation)

fr:Faris